In wireless communications, channel state information (CSI) is the known channel properties of a communication link. This information describes how a signal propagates from the transmitter to the receiver and represents the combined effect of, for example, scattering, fading, and power decay with distance. The method is called Channel estimation. The CSI makes it possible to adapt transmissions to current channel conditions, which is crucial for achieving reliable communication with high data rates in multiantenna systems.

CSI needs to be estimated at the receiver and usually quantized and feedback to the transmitter (although reverse-link estimation is possible in TDD systems). Therefore, the transmitter and receiver can have different CSI. The CSI at the transmitter and the CSI at the receiver are sometimes referred to as CSIT and CSIR, respectively.

Different kinds of channel state information 

There are basically two levels of CSI, namely instantaneous CSI and statistical CSI.

Instantaneous CSI (or short-term CSI) means that the current channel conditions are known, which can be viewed as knowing the impulse response of a digital filter. This gives an opportunity to adapt the transmitted signal to the impulse response and thereby optimize the received signal for spatial multiplexing or to achieve low bit error rates.

Statistical CSI (or long-term CSI) means that a statistical characterization of the channel is known. This description can include, for example, the type of fading distribution, the average channel gain, the line-of-sight component, and the spatial correlation. As with instantaneous CSI, this information can be used for transmission optimization.

The CSI acquisition is practically limited by how fast the channel conditions are changing. In fast fading systems where channel conditions vary rapidly under the transmission of a single information symbol, only statistical CSI is reasonable. On the other hand, in slow fading systems instantaneous CSI can be estimated with reasonable accuracy and used for transmission adaptation for some time before being outdated.

In practical systems, the available CSI often lies in between these two levels; instantaneous CSI with some estimation/quantization error is combined with statistical information.

Mathematical description 

In a narrowband flat-fading channel with multiple transmit and receive antennas (MIMO), the system is modeled as

The noise is often modeled as circular symmetric complex normal with

where the mean value is zero and the noise covariance matrix  is known.

Instantaneous CSI 
Ideally, the channel matrix  is known perfectly. Due to channel estimation errors, the channel information can be represented as

Statistical CSI 
In a Rayleigh fading channel, this corresponds to knowing that

for some known channel covariance matrix .

Estimation of CSI 
Since the channel conditions vary, instantaneous CSI needs to be estimated on a short-term basis. A popular approach is so-called training sequence (or pilot sequence), where a known signal is transmitted and the channel matrix  is estimated using the combined knowledge of the transmitted and received signal.

Let the training sequence be denoted , where the vector  is transmitted over the channel as

with the training matrix  and the noise matrix .

Least-square estimation 
If the channel and noise distributions are unknown, then the least-square estimator (also known as the minimum-variance unbiased estimator) is

where  denotes the conjugate transpose. The estimation Mean Square Error (MSE) is proportional to

where  denotes the trace. The error is minimized when  is a scaled identity matrix. This can only be achieved when  is equal to (or larger than) the number of transmit antennas. The simplest example of an optimal training matrix is to select  as a (scaled) identity matrix of the same size that the number of transmit antennas.

MMSE estimation 
If the channel and noise distributions are known, then this a priori information can be exploited to decrease the estimation error. This approach is known as Bayesian estimation and for Rayleigh fading channels it exploits that 

The MMSE estimator is the Bayesian counterpart to the least-square estimator and becomes

where  denotes the Kronecker product and the identity matrix  has the dimension of the number of receive antennas. The estimation Mean Square Error (MSE) is

and is minimized by a training matrix  that in general can only be derived through numerical optimization. But there exist heuristic solutions with good performance based on waterfilling. As opposed to least-square estimation, the estimation error for spatially correlated channels can be minimized even if  is smaller than the number of transmit antennas. Thus, MMSE estimation can both decrease the estimation error and shorten the required training sequence. It needs however additionally the knowledge of the channel correlation matrix  and noise correlation matrix . In absence of an accurate knowledge of these correlation matrices, robust choices need to be made to avoid MSE degradation.

Data-aided versus blind estimation 
In a data-aided approach, the channel estimation is based on some known data, which is known both at the transmitter and at the receiver, such as training sequences or pilot data. In a blind approach, the estimation is based only on the received data, without any known transmitted sequence. The tradeoff is the accuracy versus the overhead. A data-aided approach requires more bandwidth or it has a higher overhead than a blind approach, but it can achieve a better channel estimation accuracy than a blind estimator.

See also 
Channel sounding

Weblinks 

 Atheros CSI Tool
 Linux 802.11n CSI Tool

References 

Wireless
Information theory
Radio resource management
Telecommunication theory